Gidwani is a surname. Notable people with the surname include:

Choithram Gidwani (1889–1957), Indian independence activist
Hari Gidwani (born 1953), Indian cricketer and selector
Kitu Gidwani (born 1967), Indian actress and model
Ishitaa Gidwani (born 1992), Hong Kong cricketer